The Right Reverend Iain MacLeod Greenshields is a Church of Scotland minister, serving as Moderator of the General Assembly since 2022. He was ordained in 1984, and previously served as minister of St Margaret's Parish Church in Dunfermline, Fife. His wife Linda is a teacher of Religious, Moral and Philosophical Studies at Levenmouth Academy, Buckhaven.

Education and early career 

The son of a Glasgow police officer, Greenshields grew up in Glasgow and studied theology at the University of Glasgow. His first parish ordination was in Cranhill. In 1993, he moved on to Larkhall, Lanarkshire. During this time, he became involved with ministry to offenders, as chaplain of Shotts prison and the Longriggend Young Offenders Institute. He moved to Kensaleyre in 2002, where he remained until 2007. It was then that he transferred to St Margaret's Community Church of Dunfermline.

Political views
Greenshields has publicly attacked the deportation policies of the United Kingdom. He has a keen interest in addiction issues, arguing that drug possession should be decriminalized.

Family life 

Greenshields and his wife have six children, three of whom have been adopted from China. Their names are Eilidh, Siona, and Siusaidh.

References

Moderators of the General Assembly of the Church of Scotland
Year of birth missing (living people)
Living people